is a garden that fuses Japanese and Western styles in Hakodate, Hokkaidō, Japan. It was constructed in 1898 (or alternatively 1895) by a prominent merchant by the name of Iwafune. The gardens are a nationally designated Place of Scenic Beauty.

See also
 Japanese gardens

References

Gardens in Hokkaido
Places of Scenic Beauty